The Winfield Township School District is a community public school district that serves students in pre-Kindergarten to eighth grade from Winfield Township in Union County, New Jersey, United States.

As of the 2018–19 school year, the district, comprising one school, had an enrollment of 139 students and 18.0 classroom teachers (on an FTE basis), for a student–teacher ratio of 7.7:1.  In the 2016–17 school year, Winfield had the 19th-smallest enrollment of any school district in the state, with 140 students.

The district is classified by the New Jersey Department of Education as being in District Factor Group "B", the second-lowest of eight groupings. District Factor Groups organize districts statewide to allow comparison by common socioeconomic characteristics of the local districts. From lowest socioeconomic status to highest, the categories are A, B, CD, DE, FG, GH, I and J.

Public school students in ninth through twelfth grades attend David Brearley High School in Kenilworth, as part of a sending/receiving relationship with the Kenilworth Public Schools. As of the 2018–19 school year, the high school had an enrollment of 757 students and 63.5 classroom teachers (on an FTE basis), for a student–teacher ratio of 11.9:1.

Before the current sending relationship had been established with Brearley, students had attended Rahway High School until a decision by the New Jersey Department of Education in March 2000 allowed for termination of the relationship.

School
Winfield School serves students in pre-kindergarten through eighth grade, including classes for students with special needs. The school had 135 students enrolled as of the 2018–19 school year.

The Winfield School fields both boys and girls sports teams. Sports offered include soccer, basketball, street hockey (sponsored by the New Jersey Devils), and baseball / softball. In 2006, the boys' basketball team was undefeated. In 2007, both the girls and boys' basketball teams were undefeated, the first time in Winfield history both teams were undefeated in the same year.

Administration
Core members of the district's administration are:
Ross LeBrun, Superintendent / Principal
Danielle Tarvin-Griffith, Business Administrator / Board Secretary

Board of education
The district's board of education, with nine members, sets policy and oversees the fiscal and educational operation of the district through its administration. As a Type II school district, the board's trustees are elected directly by voters to serve three-year terms of office on a staggered basis, with three seats up for election each year held (since 2012) as part of the November general election. The board appoints a superintendent to oversee the day-to-day operation of the district.

References

External links
Winfield Township School District

School Data for the Winfield Township School District, National Center for Education Statistics

Winfield Township, New Jersey
New Jersey District Factor Group B
School districts in Union County, New Jersey